

The Douglas-Daly Experiment Station was an extensive research site of the Northern Territory Administration (NTA) of the Government of Australia and, after statehood, of the Northern Territory Government. It formed part of a string of similar research sites in northern Australia. Located at the junction of the Douglas and Daly Rivers and covering an area of approximately 100 km², the site spanned three major soil types of the Top End of the Northern Territory — Blain,  Tippera  and  Florina  soil types.

The climate is hot-humid tropical with a distinct six-month dry season and an annual rainfall of around 1 m. It was used mainly for pasture, forage, and grazing experiments, with its main research activity beginning in the 1960s and continuing until the break-up of the site into development farms in the 1980s.

Research from the site is mainly documented in scientific journal papers and annals of the NTA. Among the researchers on the site have been Bruce Franks, John Sturtz, John Austin and Lindsay Falvey, who were supported by the manager Heinz Mollman. The site was also used by CSIRO, especially for the rock-phosphate research of Ray Swaby.

Douglas Daly School
The research farm has hosted a primary school for the children of farm employees and local residents since 1982.  In 2018, the school, which is operated by the Northern Territory Government, had a total enrolment of 12 students and a teaching staff of three.

Weather station
The Douglas-Daly Research Farm has been the site of an official weather station since January 1968.

References

Further reading
Australian Journal of Experimental Agriculture and Animal Husbandry   17:724-727. "Response of steers to dry season supplementation on improved pastures." (1977).

External links
Douglas Daly School website

Scientific organisations based in Australia
Government agencies of the Northern Territory